William Chapman (born 1930) is an American journalist.  He began as a reporter in 1956, and joined The Washington Post in 1960. He was assigned by the Post to Tokyo as their bureau chief in 1977, and is the author of Inside the Philippine Revolution (1988) and  Inventing Japan: The Making of a Postwar Civilization (1991).

Chapman obtained a BA from DePauw University and an MA in political science from New York University.

Notes

1930 births
Living people
American male journalists
DePauw University alumni
New York University alumni